Pristimantis dorsopictus is a species of frog in the family Strabomantidae.
It is endemic to Colombia.
Its natural habitats are tropical moist montane forests and high-altitude grassland.
It is threatened by habitat loss.

Images

References

dorsopictus
Endemic fauna of Colombia
Amphibians of Colombia
Amphibians of the Andes
Amphibians described in 1988
Taxonomy articles created by Polbot